BET1 homolog is a protein that in humans is encoded by the BET1 gene.

This gene encodes a golgi-associated membrane protein that participates in vesicular transport from the endoplasmic reticulum (ER) to the Golgi complex. The encoded protein functions as a soluble N-ethylaleimide-sensitive factor attachment protein receptor and may be involved in the docking of ER-derived vesicles with the cis-Golgi membrane. Alternatively spliced transcript variants encoding different isoforms have been described but their full-length nature has not been determined.

References

Further reading

External links